Adelaide Tonight was a nightly variety show, running four days a week at 9.30 pm on Nine Network, NWS-9 Adelaide. The show was broadcast live from Studio 1 between 1959 and 1973. The show was similar to In Melbourne Tonight with Graham Kennedy.

The comperes and presenters on the show were Lionel Williams, Kevin Crease, Ernie Sigley, Ian Fairweather, Gerry Gibson, Roger Cardwell and Anne Wills.
Creator and host Lionel Williams who won a Logie award for the program died in 2016, aged 87.

References

External links

Mass media in Adelaide
Australian variety television shows
Television shows set in Adelaide
Black-and-white Australian television shows
Nine Network original programming
1959 Australian television series debuts
1973 Australian television series endings
1960s Australian television series